The 173rd Fighter Wing (173 FW) is a unit of the Oregon Air National Guard, stationed at Kingsley Field Air National Guard Base, Klamath Falls, Oregon. If activated to federal service, the wing is gained by the Air Education and Training Command (AETC) of the United States Air Force.

Overview
Kingsley Field ANGB, which is located in Klamath Falls, Oregon, is home to the 173d Fighter Wing. The 173d Fighter Wing is responsible for training combat pilots and support personnel on the F-15C and F-15D Eagle for the active duty Air Force and the Air National Guard. In addition, as part of the Air National Guard, the 173 FW serves the state of Oregon and the United States in times of peace and war.

Units
 173d Operations Group
 114th Fighter Squadron
 270th Air Traffic Control Squadron
 173d Maintenance Group
 173d Mission Support Group
 173d Medical Group

History
On 1 April 1996, the 173d Fighter Wing was formed at Kingsley Field ANGB as a host organization and parent unit for the 114th Fighter Squadron (114 FS) when the unit was authorized to expand, with the 114th being transferred from the 142d Fighter Wing at Portland to the new wing at Kingsley ANGB. The 173d Fighter Wing consists of the 173d Operations Group; 173d Maintenance Group, 173d Mission Support Group and 173d Medical Group.

Initially flying early versions of the F-16 Fighting Falcon aircraft as a formal training unit (FTU), the F-16As and F-16Bs were retired in the late 1990s as their service life was ending. The squadron began receiving F-15A and F-15B Eagles in 1998, upgrading to the F-15C and F-15D Eagle in 2004 as the A and B series aircraft were retired and continuing its mission as a fighter-interceptor training unit for the Air Force and the Air National Guard.

Lineage
 Designated 173d Fighter Wing, and allotted to Oregon ANG, 1996
 Extended federal recognition and activated, 1 April 1996

Assignments
 Oregon Air National Guard
 Gained by: Air Education and Training Command

Components
 173d Operations Group, 1 April 1996 – present
 114th Fighter Squadron, 1 April 1996 – present

Stations
 Kingsley Field Air National Guard Base, Oregon, 1 April 1996 – present

Aircraft
 F-16A/B Fighting Falcon, 1996–1998
 F-15A/B Eagle, 1998–2004
 F-15C/D Eagle, 2004–present

References

 173rd Fighter Wing lineage and history
 Rogers, B. (2006). United States Air Force Unit Designations Since 1978. 
 173rd Fighter Wing website

External links

Wings of the United States Air National Guard
Military units and formations in Oregon
173
1996 establishments in Oregon